The gluconate:H+ symporter (GntP) family (TC# 2.A.8) is a family of transport proteins belonging to the ion transporter (IT) superfamily. Members of the GntP family include known gluconate permeases of E. coli and Bacillus species such as the D-Gluconate:H+ symporter of Bacillus subtillus (GntP; TC# 2.A.8.1.1) and the D-fructuronate/D-gluconate:H+ symporter of E. coli (GntP; TC# 2.A.8.1.3). A representative list of proteins belonging to the GntP family can be found in the Transporter Classification Database.

Structure 
Bioinformatic analysis suggests these proteins are of about 450 residues and possess 12 or 14 putative transmembrane α-helical spanners. No crystal structure data are available for GntP proteins as of early 2016.

Function 
Four of the seven E. coli paralogues have been found to possess active gluconate uptake activity, and one of them (GntW; TC# 2.A.8.1.2) can accommodate both L-idonate and D-gluconate, although L-idonate is the physiological substrate. Another (GntP) transports D-gluconate with high affinity but is specifically induced by and transports D-fructuronate. GntT of E. coli is the physiological gluconate permease.

Transport reaction 
The generalized transport reaction catalyzed by proteins of the GntP family is:

Carbohydrate acid (out) + nH+ (out) → Carbohydrate acid (in) + nH+ (in)

References 

Protein families
Solute carrier family